Strathisla Mills railway station served the town of Keith, Moray, Scotland from 1985 to 1993 on the Keith and Dufftown Railway.

History 
The station opened in 1985 by ScotRail, although it was only used for excursions at first until opening to the public on 29 May 1989. It was only intended to serve visitors at Strathisla distillery. The station closed in August 1993.

References

External links 

Disused railway stations in Moray
Railway stations in Great Britain opened in 1985
Railway stations in Great Britain closed in 1993
Railway stations opened by British Rail
1985 establishments in Scotland
1993 disestablishments in Scotland